Habiba Ifrakh (born 3 March 1978) is a Moroccan former professional tennis player.

Trained at the Wifaq Tennis Academy in Rabat, Ifrakh was a member of the Morocco Fed Cup team between 1995 and 2009, winning seven singles and one doubles rubber across 14 ties. She also represented Morocco at the Mediterranean Games and Pan Arab Games.

Ifrakh had a best world ranking of 652 in singles and made two WTA Tour main draw appearances. In 2001, as a wildcard entrant in Casablanca, she won her first round match against Dutch player Kristie Boogert.

ITF finals

Doubles: 1 (0–1)

References

External links
 
 
 

1978 births
Living people
Moroccan female tennis players
Competitors at the 2005 Mediterranean Games
Mediterranean Games competitors for Morocco
20th-century Moroccan women
21st-century Moroccan women